The  is a local railway line in Japan, operated by the East Japan Railway Company (JR East). It connected Maeyachi Station in the city of Ishinomaki, Miyagi to Kesennuma Station in the city of Kesennuma, Miyagi. The route links the north-eastern coast of Miyagi Prefecture, with the Ishinomaki Line (and the Tohoku Main Line a few stops farther) available for transfer in the south, and the Ōfunato Line in the north.

A large section of the railway infrastructure between Minami-Kesennuma Station and Rikuzen-Togura Station, including tracks, stations, and railway bridges, were badly damaged or destroyed by the 2011 Tōhoku earthquake and tsunami.  Destroyed stations include Minami-Kesennuma (except for the platform) and Shizugawa Station, as well as various others. As a result of the catastrophic damage to the line and prohibitive costs of restoration as a railway, JR East officially proposed the line's conversion into a dedicated bus rapid transit (BRT) route on 27 December 2011. At present only the Maeyachi to Yanaizu section is operated as a railway, with services on the balance of the route provided by buses.

An autonomous driving system has been being tested on the BRT line since 2018 and has been fully implemented since 5 December 2022.

Service
Although the Kesennuma Line's south end is Maeyachi, its operational south end should be considered Kogota Station in Misato, as the majority of Kesennuma Line trains either have Kogota as their south terminus or go through it on the way to Sendai. Trains going this far also stop at Kami-Wakuya (local only) and Wakuya Stations in Wakuya, Miyagi on the Ishinomaki Line.

Station list
Greyed-out stations have been closed since the 2011 Tōhoku earthquake and tsunami, and operate only as bus stops for the JR East BRT route.

History

April 11, 1956: Ōfunato Line begins operation as a freight line between Kesennuma and Kesennuma-Minato stations
February 11, 1957: Kesennuma Line operates as a passenger line between Minami-Kesennuma and Motoyoshi stations. Ōfunato Freight Line is merged into the Kesennuma Line. Kesennuma to Minami-Kesennuma is open to the public. Minami-Kesennuma, Matsuiwa, Rikuzen-Hashikami, Ōya, Oganezawa, Motoyoshi stations begin operation
November 10, 1960: Fudōnosawa station begins operation
July 20, 1967: Saichi station begins operation
October 24, 1968: Yanaizu Line begins operation between Maeyachi and Yanaizu stations. Wabuchi, Nonodake, Rikuzen-Toyosato, Mitakedō, and Yanaizu stations begin operation
December 11, 1977: Kesennuma Line connects Motoyoshi and Yanaizu stations. Rikuzen-Yokoyama, Rikuzen-Togura, Shizugawa, Shizuhama, Utatsu, Rikuzen-Minato, Kurauchi and Rikuzen-Koizumi stations begin operation. The freight line between Motoyoshi and Minami-Kesennuma is abolished. Kesennuma Line merges with the Yanaizu Line and runs from Maeyachi to Kesennuma. The freight line runs from Minami-Kesennuma to Kesennuma-Minato.
November 1, 1979: The remaining freight line is abolished and Kesennuma-Minato station ceases operation.
April 1, 1987: Kesennuma Line becomes part of JR East.
March 22, 1997: Ōya station is renamed Ōya-Kaigan station
March 11, 2011: Line closed following major damage in 2011 Tōhoku earthquake and tsunami.
April 29, 2011: Rail service restored on Maeyachi - Yanaizu segment.
May 7, 2012: Local authorities agree to BRT service to Kesennuma.
August 20, 2012: BRT roadway completed between Rikuzen-Hashikami and Saichi. 
December 22, 2012: BRT service commences between Yanaizu and Kesennuma.

References

External links
 A set of 11 videos showing a train trip along the entire Kesennuma Line, in 2009.  Much of the track and scenery seen here were destroyed by the 2011 tsunami.

 
Lines of East Japan Railway Company
Rail transport in Miyagi Prefecture
1067 mm gauge railways in Japan
Railway lines opened in 1956
1956 establishments in Japan
Bus rapid transit in Japan